In chemistry and thermodynamics, the enthalpy of neutralization is the change in enthalpy that occurs when one equivalent of an acid and a base undergo a neutralization reaction to form water and a salt. It is a special case of the enthalpy of reaction. It is defined as the energy released with the formation of 1 mole of water.
When a reaction is carried out under standard conditions at the temperature of 298 K (25 degrees Celsius) and 1 atm of pressure and one mole of water is formed, the heat released by the reaction is called the standard enthalpy of neutralization.

The heat released during a reaction is

From this, the standard enthalpy change is obtained by division with the amount of substance (in moles) involved.

When a strong acid, HA, reacts with a strong base, BOH, the reaction that occurs is
H+ + OH^- -> H2O    
as the acid and the base are fully dissociated and neither the cation  nor the anion  are involved in the neutralization reaction. The enthalpy change for this reaction  is -57.62 kJ/mol at 25 °C.

For weak acids or bases, the heat of neutralization is pH-dependent. In the absence of any added mineral acid or alkali, some heat is required for complete dissociation. The total heat evolved during neutralization will be smaller.

e.g.  at 25°C

The heat of ionization for this reaction is equal to (–12 + 57.3) = 45.3 kJ/mol at 25 °C.

References

Enthalpy
Thermochemistry
Acid–base chemistry